Iglesia de San Pedro is a church in La Felguera, Asturias, Spain. Formally opened in 1954, a small chapel was located on the site from 1604. In the 1880s work began on the new church but was rebuilt in the 1940s after the Spanish Civil War. 

Pedro, La Felguera
1954 establishments in Spain